All India Dalit Rights Movement is the dalit wing of the Communist Party of India. It was formed in an all India conference held from 18,19 December 2021.

Office bearers
General Secretary - V. S. Nirmalkumar
President - A. Ramamoorthy
Vice President - Janki Paswan, Peelingam, Mahadevgade
Secretary - N. Rajan, Karavadhi Subbarao, Suryakant Paswan
Treasurer - Devikumari

References

Organizations established in 2021
Communist Party of India mass organisations